İbrahim Demir (born 2 September 1995) is a Turkish footballer who plays as a goalkeeper for Serik Belediyespor.

External links
 
 
 

1995 births
Living people
Sportspeople from Trabzon
Turkish footballers
Turkey youth international footballers
Trabzonspor footballers
Süper Lig players
Association football goalkeepers